John A. Collins (September 17, 1931 – May 7, 2003) was Chief of Chaplains of the United States Air Force.

Biography
Born in Boston, Massachusetts, in 1931, Collins was an ordained Roman Catholic priest in the Redemptorist Order. Collins died on May 7, 2003, and is buried at Arlington National Cemetery.

Career
Collins joined the United States Air Force in 1960. Eventually, he would become Deputy Chief of Chaplains of the United States Air Force in 1980 before being promoted to Chief of Chaplains with the rank of major general in 1982. He held the position until his retirement in 1985.

Awards he received include the Legion of Merit, the Meritorious Service Medal with two oak leaf clusters, the Air Force Commendation Medal with oak leaf cluster, the Outstanding Unit Award and the National Defense Service Medal.

References

External links

 

People from Boston
United States Air Force generals
Chiefs of Chaplains of the United States Air Force
Redemptorists
Recipients of the Legion of Merit
1931 births
2003 deaths
Burials at Arlington National Cemetery
Catholics from Massachusetts
20th-century American Roman Catholic priests
Military personnel from Massachusetts